Albert Jesse Toeaina (born June 26, 1984) was a professional American and Canadian football offensive tackle for the Las Vegas Locomotives of the United Football League. He was signed by the Carolina Panthers as an undrafted free agent in 2006. He played college football at Tennessee.

Toeaina was born in San Francisco to a Samoan American family. Growing up in Antioch, California, Toeiana graduated from Pittsburg High School. He began his college football career at the City College of San Francisco before transferring to the University of Tennessee.

He has also been a member of the Oakland Raiders and Hamilton Tiger-Cats.

References

External links
Just Sports Stats

Living people
1984 births
Players of American football from San Francisco
Players of Canadian football from San Francisco
American football offensive tackles
Canadian football offensive linemen
Tennessee Volunteers football players
Carolina Panthers players
Oakland Raiders players
Hamilton Tiger-Cats players
Las Vegas Locomotives players
American people of Samoan descent
People from Antioch, California
City College of San Francisco Rams football players